Michael W. Lamach is the chairman and CEO of Trane Technologies.

Early life and career
Lamach received a Bachelor in Engineering from Michigan State University and a Master in Business Administration from Duke University's Fuqua School of Business. 

He grew up in Clinton Township, Michigan. He also has 2 sisters, one younger and one older. 
He is married and has 3 children.

Lamach joined Ingersoll Rand in 2004, became CEO and Chairman in 2010.

He received the Michigan State University's 2019 Alumni Grand Award.

References

Fuqua School of Business alumni
Living people
Michigan State University alumni
PPG Industries people
Ingersoll Rand people
Year of birth missing (living people)